Constantin Radu (born 26 April 1996) is a Romanian rower. He competed in the men's eight event at the 2020 Summer Olympics.

References

External links
 

1996 births
Living people
Romanian male rowers
Olympic rowers of Romania
Rowers at the 2020 Summer Olympics
Sportspeople from Suceava